Hollybush Hill is situated in the range of Malvern Hills that runs approximately  north–south along the Herefordshire–Worcestershire border. It lies to the east of Midsummer Hill.

History
It is the site of an Iron Age hill fort which spans Hollybush Hill and Midsummer Hill. The hillfort is protected as a Scheduled Ancient Monument and is owned by Natural England. It can be accessed via a footpath which leads south from the car park at British Camp on the A449 or a footpath which heads north from the car park in Hollybush on the A438.

References

Further reading

External links
Midsummer Hill Camp at Pastscape
Midsummer Hill Camp Monument Detail
Aerial view of Hollybush Hill

Marilyns of England
Hills of Worcestershire
Malvern Hills
Hill forts in Herefordshire
Former populated places in Herefordshire